Victory is the eleventh studio album by German band Running Wild. It is the third and final album in a trilogy of a theme of good versus evil, started with Masquerade and continued with The Rivalry.

Songs
"Tsar" is about the Russian Emperor Nikolai II.

Track listing
All tracks written by Rolf Kasparek except where noted

Personnel
 Rolf Kasparek – vocals, guitar
 Thilo Hermann – guitars
 Thomas Smuszynski – bass guitar
 Angelo Sasso – drums

Additional Musicians
 Ralf Nowy – keyboards on "The Final Waltz"
 Matthias Liebetruth – hi-hat overdubs

Production
 Gerhard Woelfe – Mixing
 Thorsten Herbig – Photography
 Rock 'n' Rolf – Producer
 Peter Dell – Artwork, Layout
 Rainer Holst – Mastering
 Katharina Nowy – Producer (additional)

Charts

References

2000 albums
Running Wild (band) albums
GUN Records albums